Ferenc Dobos (25 April 1912 – May 1992) was a Hungarian rower. He competed in the men's coxless four at the 1936 Summer Olympics.

References

1912 births
1992 deaths
Hungarian male rowers
Olympic rowers of Hungary
Rowers at the 1936 Summer Olympics
People from Odorheiu Secuiesc